Nandavanampatti is a village in the Thanjavur taluk of Thanjavur district, Tamil Nadu, India.

Demographics 

As per the 2001 census, Nandavanampatti had a total population of 1895 with 962 males and 933 females. The sex ratio was 970. The literacy rate was 66.79.

References 

Villages in Thanjavur district